Pradeep Mahto alias Pradeep Kumar is a former Member of Legislative Assembly for the year 2005 and 2010 from the Warisaliganj (Vidhan Sabha constituency) of the Nawada region of Bihar. Mahto is a nephew and former associate  of Ashok Mahto, the gangster who was indulged  in a long drawn battle with Akhilesh Singh, another gangster of the region. The Mahto and Singh gang were arranged on the caste lines and proclaimed themselves as the group serving the interest of Kurmi and Bhumihar community of the region respectively.

Biography
Mahto was born to Laxmi Mahto and has remained  associated  with his uncle's gang in initial years of life. After the arrest of Ashok Mahto he became the de facto leader of the faction which was associated with the several killings in the region particularly of upper-caste people and supporters of Akhilesh Singh. In 2000 Aruna Devi, the wife of Akhilesh Singh was elected as the Member of Legislative Assembly from the Warisaliganj. In 2005 she again contested the election from the same seat but this time on the symbol of Lok Janshakti Party. Aruna though won in February but in the by polls held in October in the same year, she lost to Pradeep Mahto, who became the MLA for the first time for a period of five years. Mahto had contested against her as Independent candidate. In 2010 Janata Dal (United) allotted its symbol to the Mahto from the Warisaliganj and he emerged victorious once again; but this time as a candidate of JD(U).

His association with JD (U) has a long history,  and he has served as the district president of the party for Nawada, for a number of times. Mahto has been facing several criminal charges including those of murder. Pradeep's  political career was shaken, when in 2015, Aruna Devi defeated him in the Assembly Election as the Bharatiya Janata Party candidate. In 2020 Pradeep  though himself being unable to contest  the assembly elections due to his conviction in one of the case launched his wife as independent candidate from Warisaliganj but she lost to Aruna once again. Mahto suspectedly was also the person behind 2001 Nawada Jail break case, in which, he surrendered in the court in the following  years, though until then, he managed to get the ticket from JD (U). In the famous Jail break case, he was accused of facilitating the escape of his uncle Ashok Mahto.

References

Living people
People from Nawada district
Bihar MLAs 2005–2010
Bihar MLAs 2010–2015
Criminals from Bihar
Year of birth missing (living people)
Bihari politicians
Janata Dal (United) politicians